Christopher Richard Grocock (born 30 October 1968) is an English lawyer and former professional footballer.

Career
Born in Grimsby, Grocock played as a left winger for Grimsby Town, Boston United, Grantham Town, Bridlington Town, Boston Town, Brigg Town and Louth United

After retiring as a player he became a solicitor.

References

1968 births
Living people
English footballers
Grimsby Town F.C. players
Boston United F.C. players
Grantham Town F.C. players
Bridlington Town A.F.C. players
Boston Town F.C. players
Brigg Town F.C. players
Louth United F.C. players
English Football League players
Association football wingers
English lawyers